The Department of Information Technology, Government of Goa has initiated & implemented State Wide Area Network in the brand name “Goa Broadband Network” (GBBN)  connecting all the 12 Talukas, 189 Village Panchayats, 225 office buildings/termination points, around 1200 Government offices/sub offices/corporations/autonomous bodies/Municipalities, around 500+ schools/colleges/educational institutes through fiber network throughout the State of Goa.
This is a unique initiative and is the only state in India to have such a rigid fiber based network. The network will be used for communicating between the G2G, G2B, G2C, and other Government departments. The network’s potential will also be harnessed by putting it into use for broader range of applications including social usage such as e-learning. Goa will be the first state to have IP based architecture, GBBN supporting voice, video and data. This is an end-to-end IP network, which carries data, phone calls as well as video conferences on the same converged infrastructure.

References

Internet in India
Mass media in Goa
Government of Goa